The Lordship of Saxons Lode (Old English for 'Lord of Viking's Iron') (Icelandic: Lávarður Saxa Lode, Danish: Herre af Sakserne Lode) was a non-metropolitan administrative manorial title in the Kingdom of England, once under the administration of the Danelaw in the 12th century. Saxons Lode Manor House is a ceremonial and historic Germanic pagan manor, situated in the West Midlands region of England.

Coat of Arms 
The raven is facing the right sword-wielding-hand, signifying those who served the Lord of Saxons Lode were exceptionally sword-skilled sword-Danes. The second set of wings behind the raven is symbolic of the sails of a Viking drakkar (Old Norse for Dragon-Ship). Atop the shield is the Valknut, the symbol of Odin in Old Norse paganism, signifying the incumbent was Nordic.

The Saxons were a group of Germanic peoples whose name was given in the early Middle Ages to a large country (Old Saxony, Latin: Saxonia) near the North Sea coast of northern Germania, in what is now Germany. In the late Roman Empire, the name was used to refer to Germanic coastal raiders, and as a name similar to the later "Viking".

The Saxons religion was initially that of Old Norse, whereby the Valknut symbol section of the Stora Hammars I stone in Gotland, Sweden depicts a Valknut in a central and predominant position, appearing alongside figures interpreted as Odin. This explains the Valknut atop the Raven as the Saxons consider Odin to be superior to the King of England.

Origin 
The Lordship of Saxons Lode was once a part of the Kingdom of Mercia, then as part of William the Conqueror's taxation system. Saxons Lode is located at the River Severn, Ripple, Worcestershire. There is evidence to suggest that while the Lord of Saxons Lode served the Christian King; Alfred the Great, the incumbent may have been a Germanic Dane pagan. This is due to the evidence of Medieval Period pagan style burials where Vikings were buried with sword and shield found as part of an archeological dig at Saxons Lode. Such burials were a practice only afforded to Viking noblemen.

Manorial lordship 
All manorial lordship titles in the United Kingdom of Great Britain and Northern Ireland (U.K) are based on a title-right attached to tangible real-estate, traded as property in law. The Lordship of Saxons Lode was held at the end of the 12th century by Jordan of Ryall. Prior to that it was held by Martin Coti. During the 13th and 14th centuries it was held by the De La Lode family. In 1590 the lordship had come to John Woodward (or Smith) who settled Saxons Lode on his son Thomas. Thomas died in 1636 leaving it to his daughter Katherine (wife of John Dormer). Since then, the manorial Lordship of Saxons Lode was dormant and could not be re-assigned unless by the Crown or as a manorial lordship re-established by legal process.

The Lordship of Saxons Lode is referred to in the Domesday Book of 1086, under the entry of Upton upon Severn, as being "also held by the Bishop of Worcester". The Lordship of Saxons Lode is a manorial lordship that originated in the 12th century with titled lands across the Ripple Parish borough. The Lord of Saxons Lode and his Fyrd were Mercian "border people", known as a "March". The Lord of Saxons Lode's responsibility to the King of England was to guard the River Severn from Viking invaders into Wessex. Saxons Lode currently is the gateway between Tewkesbury and Worcestershire, which respectively was the border between Mercia and Wessex.

Current status 
Today, the Lordship of Saxons Lode is an incorporeal hereditary manorial lordship re-established by legal process to the current 7th Lord of Saxons Lode by an official seignory in the U.K. Lordship titles of nobility cannot be sold, or re-assigned in the U.K, but manorial lordship titles are hereditary and able to be re-assigned. However, once re-assigned the lordship no longer includes manorial rights. The legal process undertaken to re-assign the Lordship of Saxons Lode involved confirming that it was a dormant lordship title of nobility, which was undertaken by Hatton Solicitors in Daventry, Northampton shire, England in 2020.

Once the Lordship of Saxons Lode was confirmed as dormant, a writ-like "deed of creation" compiled by an official licensed seignory was created. The writ involved statements patent from three independent solicitors in the UK in 2020. The legal statements described the dormancy, legitimacy and existence of the Lordship of Saxons Lode in a deed. The deed found the semi-extinct form of Saxons Lode as a landed property, in the form of the court baron, Nulle terre sans seigneur ('No land without a lord'). A seignory registered the manorial Lordship of Saxons Lode in the London Gazette, the official journal of the U.K.  

The extant manorial Lordship of Saxons Lode is incorporeal and does not entitle the owner to any land or migration rights in the U.K, however it can be used on some official identification documents. An incorporeal hereditary title similar to such a lordship is known in French as Sieur or Seigneur du Manoir, Gutsherr in German, Kaleağası (Kaleagasi) in Turkish, Godsherre in Norwegian and Swedish, Breyr in Welsh, Ambachtsheer in Dutch, and Signore or Vassallo in Italian.

Historic significance 
An archaeological dig at Saxons Lode Farm, Ripple during 2001 and 2002 of two separate areas of archaeological potential identified different densities and types of multiperiod remains. Despite significant levels of truncation, Area 1, featured exposed Bronze Age ritual activity or Middle-Iron Age settlement. In Area 2, a much higher density of remains were recorded. One group of features may also have represented Bronze Age Germanic Dane ritual activity, but the majority of features related to later Iron Age activity, an early Roman British settlement and an early to middle Anglo-Saxon settlement. The later Iron Age activity was represented entirely by grain storage pits.

Medieval history 
The medieval connections at Saxons Lode contemporaneous to the Lordship of Saxons Lode were not apparent in the settlement evidence as part of the dig. However, previous archaeological evidence for Anglo-Saxon settlement in the region consisted of isolated pagan-style cemeteries. At a regional level, Saxons Lode may have flourished when Worcestershire fell under the control of the Kingdom of the Hwicce around the mid seventh century.  

The adoption of Anglo-Saxon material culture may have been encouraged at Saxons Lode understood in part due to radiocarbon dating corresponding to the Early Anglo-Saxon period. The dominance of Mercian power at Saxons Lode was accompanied by a rapid adoption of the Anglo-Saxon language over the Western Germanic Saxon language. From the River Severn, within the vicinity of Saxons Lode, King Alfred began planning the Battle of Cynwit in 878 during the Viking invasions of England. From this Anglo-Saxon victory, King Alfred, with the advantage of the Great Heathen Army suffering significant losses at Cynwit, won the Battle of Eddington, cementing his idea of a future unified England.

Battle of Upton 
The Battle of Upton was fought on 28 August 1651 when a New Model Army detachment under the command of Colonel John Lambert made a surprise attack on Royalists defending the river Severn crossing at Saxons Lode, Upton-upon-Severn. In the action which followed the Royalist were driven out of the town and north along the Worcester Road.

See also 
 Hwicce
 Æthelred, Lord of the Mercians
Danes (Germanic Saxon tribe)

References 

Archaeological sites in Worcestershire
Bronze Age England
History of Worcestershire
2001 archaeological discoveries
Anglo-Saxon sites in England